Shona Zammit (born 15 June 1996) is a Maltese footballer who plays as a midfielder for the Malta women's national team.

Honours 

Hibernians
Maltese First Division: 2014–15, 2015–16

See also
List of Malta women's international footballers

References 

1996 births
Living people
Maltese women's footballers
Malta women's international footballers
Women's association football midfielders
A.S.D. Pink Sport Time players
Expatriate women's footballers in Italy
Maltese expatriate sportspeople in Italy
Serie A (women's football) players
Hibernian F.C. players
Malta women's youth international footballers